General elections were held in Trinidad and Tobago on 28 October 1946, alongside local elections. The Butler Party and the United Front won three seats each. Voter turnout was 52.9%.

Results

Elected members

References

Trinidad
Elections in Trinidad and Tobago
1946 in Trinidad and Tobago